Saurogobio immaculatus is a species of cyprinid fish found in China and Vietnam.

References

Saurogobio
Fish described in 1927